Waves of Fate (German: Wogen des Schicksals) is a 1918 German silent drama film directed by Joe May and starring Mia May, Erich Kaiser-Titz and Georg John.

Cast
Mia May
Erich Kaiser-Titz
Georg John
Rolf Brunner
Frida Richard
Elga Beck
Hermann Vallentin

References

External links

Films of the German Empire
German silent feature films
Films directed by Joe May
German drama films
1918 drama films
UFA GmbH films
German black-and-white films
Silent drama films
1910s German films
1910s German-language films